Leawarra railway station is located on the Stony Point line in Victoria, Australia. It serves the south-eastern Melbourne suburb of Frankston, and it opened on 30 November 1959 as Rail Motor Stopping Place No. 16. It was renamed Leawarra in 1962.

The station serves the nearby Peninsula Campus of Monash University.

History

Leawarra station opened on 30 November 1959 as Rail Motor Stopping Place No. 16. On 24 April 1961, a  platform was provided to replace the stopping place. The following year, it was renamed Leawarra.

On 22 June 1981, the passenger service between Frankston and Stony Point was withdrawn and replaced with a bus service. On 16 September 1984, promotional trips for the reopening of the line began and, on 27 September of that year, the passenger service was reinstated.

In 1988, the platform was extended to accommodate a DRC railcar with an MTH carriage. In 1989, boom barriers were provided at the nearby McMahons Road and Hillcrest Road level crossings, located in the up and down directions of the station respectively.

Langwarrin, a closed station on the Stony Point line, was located between Leawarra and Baxter.

Platforms, facilities and services
Leawarra has one platform, and is located on Bloom Street, which provides access. It has a small passenger shelter and a myki ticket machine under another shelter. It is served by Stony Point line trains.

Platform 1:
  all stations services to Frankston; all stations services to Stony Point

Transport links
Cranbourne Transit operates three routes via Leawarra station, under contract to Public Transport Victoria:
 : Frankston station – Langwarrin
 : Frankston station – Langwarrin
 : Frankston station – Cranbourne station

References

External links
 Melway map at street-directory.com.au

Railway stations in Melbourne
Railway stations in Australia opened in 1959
Railway stations in the City of Frankston